Carl Sullivan is a former defensive end in the National Football League.

Biography
Sullivan was born Carl Jeffery Sullivan on April 30, 1962 in San Jose, California.

Career
Sullivan played with the Green Bay Packers during the 1987 NFL season. He played at the collegiate level at San Jose State University.

See also
List of Green Bay Packers players

References

Players of American football from San Jose, California
Green Bay Packers players
American football defensive ends
San Jose State University alumni
San Jose State Spartans football players
Living people
1962 births